Microrape is a genus of moths in the family Megalopygidae.

Species
Microrape camela Hopp, 1927
Microrape cristata Hopp, 1927
Microrape filata Hopp, 1927
Microrape gnathata Hopp, 1927
Microrape hippopotama Hopp, 1927
Microrape jasminatus (Dognin, 1893)
Microrape minuta (Druce, 1886)
Microrape nivea (Hopp, 1922)
Microrape santiago (Hopp, 1922)
Microrape shilluca Schaus, 1929
Microrape signata Hopp, 1930
Microrape simplex Hopp, 1927

References

Megalopygidae
Megalopygidae genera